Paul Campbell (born June 22, 1979) is a Canadian actor.

Life and career
Paul grew up in White Rock, British Columbia, and graduated from Semiahmoo Secondary in 1997.

From 2004 to 2006 he portrayed Billy Keikeya on the reimagined Battlestar Galactica. Campbell's character was a personal assistant to President Laura Roslin.

Campbell made his first foray into comedy in 2005, starring in the Bill Lawrence TV pilot Nobody's Watching, for The WB. The pilot was not picked up to series but gained later notoriety when it was posted to YouTube. He starred in National Lampoon's Bag Boy with Dennis Farina in 2007.

In 2008, Campbell appeared in the romantic comedy Play the Game alongside Andy Griffith, Doris Roberts, Liz Sheridan, and Marla Sokoloff. Campbell played a young ladies' man who teaches his lonely, widowed grandfather how to re-enter the dating world after a 60-year hiatus.

Also in 2008, Campbell, playing "Billy" for the second time co-starred on NBC's Knight Rider reboot.

In March 2009, Campbell was cast in an ABC comedy pilot based on the British series No Heroics, which revolves around four B-list superheroes. He played the leader of the group, Pete, aka Chillout, a Canadian-born superhero who can freeze small objects. The pilot was not picked up by ABC.

In 2010, Campbell starred in the comedy series Almost Heroes alongside series co-creator Ryan Belleville and actors Colin Mochrie, Lauren Ash and Athena Karkanis. The series debuted on Showcase in June 2011, with the finale of the eight-episode first season airing July 21.

Campbell led the cast of the CTV comedy series Spun Out, alongside Dave Foley, Rebecca Dalton, Al Mukadam, Holly Deveaux, J. P. Manoux and Darcy Michael.

Filmography

References

External links

1979 births
Living people
Male actors from Vancouver
Canadian male film actors
Canadian male television actors
21st-century Canadian male actors